Leonardo Bistolfi (14 March 1859 – 2 September 1933) was an Italian sculptor and an important exponent of Italian Symbolism.

Biography
Bistolfi was born in Casale Monferrato in Piedmont, north-west Italy, to Giovanni Bistolfi, a sculptor in wood, and to Angela Amisano. Giovanni died at the age of 26 years, when Leonardo was still a boy.

In 1876 he enrolled in the Brera Art Academy in Milan, where his teacher was Giosuè Argenti. In 1880 he studied under Odoardo Tabacchi at the Accademia Albertina in Turin.

Work

His first works, executed between 1880 and 1885, show the influence of the Milanese Scapigliatura movement. These first works include Le lavandaie (The Washerwomen), Tramonto (Sunset), Vespero (‘Evening’), Boaro (Cattle-hand), Gli amanti (The Lovers). The work of Gli Amanti was rejected from a Turin Promotrice circa 1880, bringing him either notoriety, or fame.

In 1882 he sculpted L'Angelo della morte (‘The Angel of Death’) for the Brayda tomb in the Turin cemetery known as the Cimitero Monumentale. He produced a number of prominent works as funeral monuments, including in 1889 of La Sfinge (The Sphinx) for the funeral monument of the Pansa family in Cuneo; in 1895 La Bellezza della Morte (The Beauty of Death) for the engineer Sebastiano Grandis at Borgo San Dalmazzo; and in 1896 La Spose della Morte(The Wife of Death) at Frascarole Lomellina.<ref>Nuova Antologia, Volume 9 (1905), article Leonardo Bistolfi, by Giovanni Cena, page 18.</ref>

In 1883 he produced a bust of the painter Antonio Fontanesi for the Accademia Albertina: these works show a turn towards Symbolism which the artist was never to abandon. From this time until 1914 Bistolfi produced many busts, medals and portraits of prominent figures including the Piedmontese painter Lorenzo Delleani, the kings of Italy Vittorio Emanuele II and Umberto I, the criminologist Cesare Lombroso, the writer Edmondo De Amicis, and the publisher and journalist Emilio Treves.

In the early 1890s he was made an honorary member of the Accademia Albertina and became secretary of the Circolo degli Artisti (‘Artists’ Circle’).

In 1892 he began a two-year task of decorating Chapel XVI of the Sacro Monte di Crea, one of the Sacri Monti of Piedmont and Lombardy.

In 1893 he married Maria Gusberti.

Also during the years 1892–1908 Bistolfi executed numerous funerary monuments (statues and bas-reliefs), including the memorial plaque for André Gladis.

In 1902, along with Davide Calandra, Giorgio Ceragioli, Enrico Reycend and Enrico Thovez, he founded the magazine L'arte decorativa moderna (‘Modern Decorative Art’). Between 1895 and 1905 he displayed works at a number of Venice Biennale exhibitions.

In 1906 he produced a monument to the painter Giovanni Segantini La bellezza liberata dalla materia (‘Beauty liberated from matter’) known also as L'alpe (‘the Alp’), which is conserved at the Galleria Nazionale d'Arte Moderna in Rome.
For the Monument of Vittorio Emanuele II in Rome Bistolfi produced the marble group Il sacrificio (‘Sacrifice’).

In 1921, his Monument to Antonio Fontanesi was erected in the Parco del Populo in Reggio Emilia.

In 1923 he was made a Senatore del Regno (Senator of the Kingdom).

In 1928 Bistolfi produced the Monumento ai Caduti'' (war memorial) for Casale Monferrato.

Bistolfi died at La Loggia, in the province of Turin, on 2 September 1933. He was interred in the cemetery of Casale Monferrato.

His work is exhibited at La Loggia, at the Musée d'Orsay in Paris, at The National Museum of Western Art in Tokyo, and at the Galleria d'Arte Moderna in Turin. The largest collection, however is at the Gipsoteca “Leonardo Bistolfi” in Casale Monferrato, where more than 170 of his works are on display in five rooms. These include drawings and sketches as well as works and bozzetti in terracotta, plasticine, and gesso and some sculptures in marble and bronze.

Sculpture by Bistolfi is also to be found in the Cimitero monumentale di Staglieno of Genoa, a town where his influence was seen in the work of a number of sculptors, particularly those specializing in funerary art.

References
The initial version of this article was based on a translation of its equivalent on the Italian Wikipedia, as retrieved on 2007-02-27.

Further reading

Biografia di Leonardo Bistolfi , from the site of the Comune di La Loggia.
 Site of the Gipsoteca “Leonardo Bistolfi” 
 

1859 births
1933 deaths
19th-century Italian male artists
19th-century Italian sculptors
20th-century Italian sculptors
20th-century Italian male artists
Accademia Albertina alumni
Brera Academy alumni
Italian male sculptors
Modern sculptors
People from Casale Monferrato
Symbolist sculptors